Khost (Matun) District is situated in the central and eastern part of Khost Province, Afghanistan. The district center is the town of Khost.

History

Nader Shah era
When Nader Shah was a general, he was responsible for putting down an uprising in the district, where the locals had rebelled against the Amir due to heavy taxation and robbery.

British era
On 2 January 1879, General Roberts entered Matun from Hazir Pir in the Kurram valley, with a small armed contingent.  The intent was to pacify the district, which was described as "an unsophisticated country where the revenue had hitherto been collected in copper."

Soviet–Afghan War
During the Soviet–Afghan War, the mujahideen guerrillas, blockaded Khost District, cutting off all lines of communication. The Soviets were forced to respond with Operation Magistral in 1987 to reopen the Khost–Gardez Road and bring relief to the District. Khost District was the scene of intense fighting in 1987, with over 1,500 guerrillas and one American adviser killed by DRA troops, according to Tass, the official Soviet news agency.

References

External links
AIMS District Map

Districts of Khost Province